Talat Soltan oglu Bakikhanov (June 13, 1927 – May 30, 2000) was an Azerbaijani musician who played the kamancheh, a mugham performer.

Life 
Talat Bakikhanov was born on June 13, 1927, in Baku. A huge role in his upbringing as a musician was played by his uncle Akhmed Bakikhanov. Talat studied with Hafiz Mirzaliyev and Firuz Alizadeh at the Azerbaijan National Conservatory Music College named after Asaf Zeynally in 1947–1949. Since 1947 he was a soloist of the Azerbaijan State Academic Philharmonic Hall named after Muslim Magomayev.

Talat Bakikhanov died on May 30, 2000, in Baku.

Musical career 
Talat Bakikhanov performed not only within Azerbaijan, but also in France, Indonesia, Malta, Iran, Iraq, Turkey, Syria. He also accompanied famous Azerbaijani khananda Mugam performers. So in the film "If Not That One, Then This One", based on the musical comedy of the same name by the Azerbaijani composer Uzeyir Hajibeyov, Talat Bakikhanov accompanies Khan Shushinski. Talat was also known as the performer of the Segah mugam in the Kamancheh.

He was a participant and winner of many symposia, both republican and international competitions. Talat Bakikhanov participated in the first and second international symposiums held in Samarkand in the 1970s and 1980s, where he presented Azerbaijani Mugham with such masters as Bahram Mansurov, Alim Gasimov.

Awards 
 Honored Artist of the Azerbaijan SSR (1975)
 Medal "Veteran of Labour" (1980)

Family 
Talat Bakikhanov was from the Bakikhanov family, one of the most famous noble families in Azerbaijan.

See also 
 Uzeyir Hajibeyov

References

 1927 births
 2000 deaths
 Burials in Baku
 Bakikhanov family
 Azerbaijani musicians
Honored Artists of the Azerbaijan SSR